is a Japanese speed skater who competed in the 1992 and 1994 Winter Olympics. He was born in Arakawa, Saitama.

In 1992 he won the bronze medal in the 500 metres event. Two years later he finished sixth in the 500 metres competition and eighth in the 1000 metres contest.

External links
 
 

1971 births
Living people
Japanese male speed skaters
Olympic speed skaters of Japan
Olympic bronze medalists for Japan
Olympic medalists in speed skating
Speed skaters at the 1992 Winter Olympics
Speed skaters at the 1994 Winter Olympics
Medalists at the 1992 Winter Olympics
Sportspeople from Saitama Prefecture
World Sprint Speed Skating Championships medalists
20th-century Japanese people